Rice Hill is an unincorporated community in Douglas County, Oregon, United States. Rice Hill has complete tourist facilities, including a truck stop, motels, and restaurants. It has long been a popular spot to stop for ice cream.

History
Rice Hill was named either for Isadore F. Rice, who settled in the area in the 1850s, or for William S. Rice, who had a Donation Land Claim at the north end of Rice Valley at about the same time. Rice Hill post office was established in 1892, and soon renamed Ricehill. The office closed in 1908. The steep grade of Rice Hill was an obstacle for pioneer travelers and it also created problems for the construction of the railroad.

Geography
Rice Hill is a summit that divides the watersheds of Elk Creek and the Umpqua River. A two-mile long valley stretches south from the community of Rice Hill. Southern Pacific Railroad (today Central Oregon and Pacific Railroad) has a station on its Siskiyou Line at the summit named Rice Hill.

References

External links
Images of Rice Hill from Flickr

Unincorporated communities in Douglas County, Oregon
1892 establishments in Oregon
Populated places established in 1892
Unincorporated communities in Oregon